Ambrosia confertiflora is a North American species of ragweed known by the common name weakleaf bur ragweed.

Description
Ambrosia confertiflorais a perennial herb reaching heights between 30 centimeters and nearly two meters with bristly, fuzzy green to brown erect stems. The multilobed fuzzy leaves have blades which can be nearly 16 centimeters long and are borne on petioles with lobed, winglike appendages. As in other ragweeds, the inflorescence has staminate (male) and pistillate (female) flower heads. The pistillate heads yield one or two fruits which are burrs up to half a centimeter long and covered in short spines.

Distribution and habitat
Ambrosia confertiflora is native to much of northern Mexico (from Sonora to Tamaulipas) and the southwestern United States from California east as far as Kansas, Oklahoma, and central Texas. It is also naturalized in various other regions, and has been declared a noxious weed in Australia and in Israel. It grows in disturbed sites.

References

External links
Calflora Database:  Ambrosia confertiflora (Weak leaved burweed,  Weakleaf burr ragweed)
Jepson Manual eFlora (TJM2) treatment of Ambrosia confertiflora
UC Calphotos Photo gallery: Ambrosia confertiflora

confertiflora
Flora of the Southwestern United States
Flora of California
Flora of the United States
Flora of the South-Central United States
Flora of the California desert regions
Flora of the Great Plains (North America)
Natural history of the California chaparral and woodlands
Natural history of the Mojave Desert
Plants described in 1836
Taxa named by Augustin Pyramus de Candolle
Flora without expected TNC conservation status